Borger Thomas (born 15 February 1995) is a Norwegian professional footballer who plays as a goalkeeper for Øygarden.

Playing career

Youth years
Thomas has Norwegian and British nationality. He spent his youth years in Bærum, joining the club at the age of 5. He was an outfield player until the age of 12, and played as a goalkeeper for Bærum's reserve team in the Norwegian Third Division at the age of 15.

Club
On 14 December 2011, he signed a three-year contract with Strømsgodset, after training with the club since August the same year. He featured in the match squad twice in both the 2012 and 2013 season, but did not play.

On 12 August 2013, he signed a loan deal with Drammen FK, in the Norwegian Third Division, for the remainder of the season.

He spent the 2014 season on loan to Stabæk in Tippeligaen He got his debut for Stabæk on 25 May in the 11th round match against Lillestrøm, since first choice Sayouba Mandé had left for the 2014 FIFA World Cup. Unfortunately, he was sent off in the 4th minute, and his team proceeded to lose the match 1-5. After being suspended for the red card, he played the full match in the 13th round against Viking, when his team lost 1-4.

On 7 August 2015, he went on loan to HamKam in the Norwegian Second Division.

On 11 January 2016, he signed a half-season loan deal with Nybergsund. He went back on 31 December 2016.

Career statistics

References

External links

1995 births
Living people
People from Arendal
Sportspeople from Bærum
Norwegian footballers
Bærum SK players
Strømsgodset Toppfotball players
Stabæk Fotball players
Nybergsund IL players
Hamarkameratene players
Åsane Fotball players
Øygarden FK players
Eliteserien players
Norwegian First Division players
Norwegian Second Division players
Association football goalkeepers
Norwegian people of British descent